Chairo may refer to:

 Chairo (slang), pejorative used in Mexico to describe an individual that adheres to a far-left ideology
 Chairo (stew), a traditional dish of the Aymara people
 Chairo Christian School, a school in Drouin, Australia
 Chairon Isenia (born 1979), Dutch baseball player
 Chairon river, near Barges, Côte-d'Or, France
 Chairon, an ancient Olympic victor in wrestling